Gaston Breitling was a Swiss watchmaker and a businessman, president of the Swiss manufacturing company Breitling SA between 1914 and 1927.

Gaston Breitling is credited for the invention of the first wristwatch chronograph in 1915.

Accomplishments

In 1915, after taking over the helm of the Breitling company, Gaston Breitling produces the world's first chronograph with central seconds hand and 30-minute counter.

Personal life 

Gaston Breitling had 1 child, Willy Breitling (1913-1979) and died 30 July 1927.

References

Books 

 Breitling Highlights - by Henning Mützlitz, 2011  
 Breitling: The History of a Great Brand of Watches (1884 – present) 
 Breitling. Die Geschichte einer großen Uhrenmarke. 1884 bis heute; Author: Benno Richter; 
 Das ZEITGEFÜHL-Uhrenbuch; Author: Gerd-Lothar Reschke; 

Swiss businesspeople
Swiss watchmakers (people)
1927 deaths